Nikolay Ilych Bestchetvertnoi was a Russian-Ukrainian Bolshevik revolutionary, Soviet politician and journalist. 

Born in 1895 in Rostov-on-Don, Bestchetvertnoi was a member of RSDLP(b) since 1915 and as a member of central committee of Communist Party of Ukraine (bolsheviks) (CP(b)U) he worked in 1918 for underground organization of the Kharkiv Governorate party committee. In 1920 Bestchetvertnoi was degraded to the status of candidate to members of the party central committee, yet he was elected as a secretary of the committee and a member of provisional bureau CP(b)U (Politburo). Bestchetvertnoi also was the chief editor of the newspaper "Kommunist of Ukraine" in 1920.

In 1927 he was excluded rom Communist Party at the 15th Congress VKP(b) and later retired. On September 4, 1936 Bestchetvertnoi was arrested and was executed by a firesquad on May 29, 1937.

References

External links
 Resolution of the 15th Congress of VKP(b) about the opposition of December 18, 1927 (Handbook on history of the Communist Party and the Soviet Union 1898–1991)
 Nikolay Bestchetvertnoi at Handbook on history of the Communist Party and the Soviet Union 1898–1991

1895 births
1937 deaths
Victims of Red Terror in Soviet Russia
Politicians from Rostov-on-Don
Russian revolutionaries
Bolsheviks
Executed Russian people
Executed people from Rostov Oblast
People executed by Russia by firing squad
First Secretaries of the Communist Party of Ukraine (Soviet Union)